Keanu Asing (born May 30, 1993) is a Hawaiian surfer who competes in the World Surf League and debuted on the World Championship Tour of the 2015 World Surf League.

Awards and achievements

Season by season
2010: 3rd in HIC Pro at Oahu (Hawaii)
2012: 3rd in Quiksilver Saquarema Prime in Saquarema (Brazil)
2013: 3rd in Vans Pro in Virginia Beach (USA)
2014: 2nd in Quiksilver Saquarema Prime in Saquarema (Brazil)
2016: winner in Quiksilver Pro France in Hossegor (France)

Training
Keanu's training has included advanced deceleration techniques, improved body control through rotational plyometrics, total body explosiveness and heat-specific conditioning.

References

External links
  Page at the site of the World Surf League

1993 births
People from Honolulu
World Surf League surfers
Sportspeople from Hawaii
Living people
American surfers
American sportspeople of Chinese descent